The 38th Infantry Division (38-ya Pekhotnaya Diviziya) was an infantry formation of the Russian Imperial Army.

Organization
1st Brigade
149th Infantry Regiment
150th Infantry Regiment
2nd Brigade
151st Infantry Regiment
152nd Infantry Regiment
38th Artillery Brigade

Commanders
1865-1868: Fyodor Radetzky
1869-1877: Arshak Ter-Gukasov
1916-1917: Józef Dowbor-Muśnicki

References

Infantry divisions of the Russian Empire
Military units and formations established in 1865
Military units and formations disestablished in 1918